São Valentim ("Saint Valentine") is a bairro in the District of São Valentim in the municipality of Santa Maria, in the Brazilian state of Rio Grande do Sul. It is situated in south of Santa Maria.

Villages 
The bairro contains the following villages: Alto das Palmeiras, Área Militar, Capão do Piquenique, Colônia Conceição, Colônia Toniolo, Laranjeiras, Passo da Laranjeira, Passo do Sarandi, Picadinha, Rincão da Lagoa, Rincão dos Brasil, Rincão dos Flores, São Valentim, Vila São Valentim.

Gallery of photos

References 

Bairros of Santa Maria, Rio Grande do Sul